The New Adventures of Beany and Cecil was a very short-lived revival of Bob Clampett's Beany and Cecil. It was produced in 1988 by DIC Animation City. Only five half-hour episodes aired out of the thirteen in production during its original run. This incarnation of the show was developed, produced, and directed by Canadian animator John Kricfalusi, who would later create Nickelodeon's The Ren & Stimpy Show.

Production
ABC had been negotiating for the production of the show with the Clampett family, who insisted that John Kricfalusi would be part of the production. The long negotiations delayed the start of production to mid-July, causing much of the animation to be rushed in order to meet the September deadline. Tensions rose between Kricfalusi and ABC over the tone of the show, leading to an uncomfortable atmosphere for the show's crew. The more ABC strove to soften the show, the more Kricfalusi pushed for shocking and offensive material. The Clampett family were ultimately not very happy with the cartoon, but remained supportive of Kricfalusi. ABC cancelled the show after a handful of episodes as they found the humor not suitable for children's programming. As a result, ABC replaced it with Hanna-Barbera's The Flintstone Kids.

Episodes
Thirteen half-hours were proposed, but only the first five were broadcast:

Cast
 Mark Hildreth – Beany
 Maurice LaMarche – Dishonest John, King Muckamuck (in "The Framed Freep"), Film Director (in "Cecil Meets Clambo")
 Jim MacGeorge – Captain Horatio Huffenpuff
 Billy West – Cecil, Dentist (in "Radio with a Bite"), DJ (in "Radio with a Bite"), Brotherhood of B.L.E.C.H. Member (in "Brotherhood of B.L.E.C.H."), Pinocchio (in "D.J.'s Disappearing Act"), Clambo (in "Cecil Meets Clambo"), Movie Trailer Announcer (in "Cecil Meets Clambo"), Head Waitress (in "The Golden Menu")

Additional voices
 Jane Mortfee
 Laura Harris
 Cree Summer-Francks

References

External links
 
 

1988 American television series debuts
1988 American television series endings
Television series by DIC Entertainment
1980s American animated television series
American children's animated fantasy television series
American Broadcasting Company original programming
Animated television series about children
Animated television series about dragons
Television series created by John Kricfalusi
Beany and Cecil